Silence is a 2006 Taiwanese drama starring Vic Chou, Park Eun-hye, Andy Hui, Megan Lai and Kingone Wang. It was produced by Comic Ritz International Production and Chai Zhi Ping (柴智屏) and Hsiao Ding-yi as producers and directed by Zhang Zhong-yi.

It was first broadcast in Taiwan on free-to-air China Television (CTV) from 21 May 2006 to 24 September 2006, on Sundays at 22:00. It was also shown on cable TV Eastern Television (ETTV).

Synopsis
Qi Wei Yi (Vic Zhou), an ambitious but lonely businessman whose only moment of happiness took place 13 years ago with a mute girl, "Zhao Shen Shen" (Park Eun-hye). When he was 15, he won a swimming competition and broke his leg, resulting in the alias "Plastered Leg". Zhao Shen Shen ditched school one day with her next-door neighbor, Zuo Jun, and got into a bus accident. She has been mute ever since. One day, on her way to the hospital, Shen Shen's mom gets hit by a car and does not survive. Wei Yi and Shen Shen both feel lonely so they send and receive messages at an abandoned bomb shelter. After a while, they meet each other and start communicating. Wei Yi does not know about Shen Shen's accident which caused her to be mute; he just thinks that Shen Shen does not like to speak. After a week of happiness, Wei Yi finds out that he has to go to England to study and transfer hospitals. A doctor helps Wei Yi see Shen Shen one more time, and he hurriedly writes down his phone number for Shen Shen.

Fast forward to 2006; Wei Yi is the CEO of his father's company while Shen Shen is still mute. They meet each other again without knowing each other's identities and slowly develop a friendship between them. Throughout many difficulties Wei Yi and Shen Shen slowly realise each other's identities; however Wei Yi finds out realises that he has cancer and has three months to live.

Cast
 Vic Zhou as Qi Wei Yi 
 Park Eun-hye as Zhao Shen Shen 
 Andy Hui as Zhuo Jun 
 Megan Lai as Mi Xiao Guang 
 Kingone Wang as Yellow 
Jin Dong as Hu Hanxin
 Lin Mei-hsiu as Huang Chih-ling

Music

 Opening theme song: "靜靜的" [Silently]  by Harlem Yu
 Ending theme song: "熟悉的溫柔" [Familiar Gentleness] by Vic Zhou

Awards

References

External links
  Silence CTV homepage

China Television original programming
2006 Taiwanese television series debuts
2006 Taiwanese television series endings
Eastern Television original programming
Television shows written by Mag Hsu
Television shows written by Ryan Tu